Ignatius Makumbe is an Anglican bishop in Zimbabwe: he succeeded Bishop Ishmael Mukuwanda as Bishop of Central Zimbabwe in 2018.

Makumbe was a teacher before his ordination in 2000. Before his election he was the incumbent at St Andrew, Gweru. 
He is married to Florah and they are blessed with two children Ngonidzashe a girl and Kudakwashe a boy.

References

Anglican bishops of Central Zimbabwe
21st-century Anglican bishops in Africa
Zimbabwean educators
Year of birth missing (living people)
Living people